Mohawk is the name of some places in the U.S. state of New York:
Mohawk, Herkimer County, New York, a village
Mohawk, Montgomery County, New York, a town